Fists in the Pocket is a 1965 Italian psychological drama film written and directed by Marco Bellocchio, his directorial debut. A dark satire of family and social values, the film centers on a young man suffering from epilepsy (played by Lou Castel in his film debut) who plots the murders of his dysfunctional family.

Fists in the Pocket was controversial upon initial release, embraced by some critics while condemned by others in the Italian filmmaking establishment. It was a significant sleeper hit and has since developed a strong following, embraced as a landmark work for the country's cinema.

Plot 

Four siblings, a sister and three brothers, live with their blind mother in a provincial villa. Three of the siblings suffer from epilepsy; the eldest son, Augusto does not. Augusto is the only provider for the family. One of the brothers, Alessandro, decides that Augusto would be free to live his life as he pleases if the mother and other siblings were gotten rid of.

He connives to be allowed to drive his mother and the other siblings on their periodic trip to a cemetery. After he has left, Augusto reads the note that Alessandro left saying that he would kill all of them and himself. Alessandro intended to drive all of them off a cliff, but does not, and they all return home safely.  Later, however, Alessandro takes his mother for a drive; they stop at an overlook, and Alessandro pushes his mother off the cliff to her death. Alessandro is not suspected.

After his mother's funeral, he kills his brother Leone by having him drink an overdose of his medication. The sister, Giulia, realizes that Alessandro killed Leone and their mother; Alessandro has an epileptic fit, and Giulia does not come to his aid.

Production 
Fists in the Pocket was Marco Bellocchio's directorial debut, having previously worked as a screenwriter. Bellocchio produced the film independently, financing it through friends and family, and filming on family property in Piacenza and Bobbio.

The role of Alessandro was originally intended for pop star Gianni Morandi, but the singer turned it down at the advice of his label RCA Records, who claimed it would hurt his career. Colombian-born Lou Castel, who took the part instead, was not a professional actor at the time, but an acquaintance whom Bellocchio met through his activities with the Italian Communist Party. At the time, Castel's only acting experience had been as an extra in Luchino Visconti's The Leopard (1963), and he did not speak Italian fluently.

Castel improvised many of the character's mannerisms and quirks, often ad libbing, much to the chagrin of his co-star Marino Masé, a classically trained actor with a theatrical background. The two frequently clashed during filming and once nearly came to blows before Bellocchio intervened. Because he wasn't yet fluent in Italian, Castel's voice was dubbed by an uncredited Paolo Carlini.

Reception 
At its premiere at the Locarno Festival, the film was condemned by Bellocchio's idols Luis Buñuel and Michelangelo Antonioni. It was received positively by younger critics and audiences, and it won the Festival's Silver Sail award. Via independent distribution it became a sleeper hit, and it won an enthusiastic response when released in France, ranking No. 10 in the Cahiers du Cinéma's Annual Top 10 List.

Chadwick Jenkins writes in PopMatters]' that the film represents the "stark shift Italian cinema cinema experienced in moving from the post-realism phase of the 1950s to the experimentalism, social commentary, and surrealism of the 1960s."

Writer Rex Pickett described Fists in the Pocket'' as one of the films he "saw in film school that transformed" him.

The film holds a 92% "Fresh" rating on Rotten Tomatoes.

Awards and nominations 

In 2008, the film was placed on the Ministry of Culture's list of 100 films to be saved, a collection of "100 films that have changed the collective memory of the country between 1942 and 1978."

Restoration 
The film underwent a 4K restoration by the L'Immagine Ritrovata laboratory which was completed in August 2015. The restoration was funded by The Cineteca di Bologna, Armani, and Kavac Film, and supervised by Bellocchio.

References

External links
 
 
 
 Fists in the Pocket: Ripped to Shreds an essay by Deborah Young at the Criterion Collection

1965 films
1965 drama films
Italian drama films
Italian psychological drama films
1960s Italian-language films
Italian black-and-white films
Films directed by Marco Bellocchio
Films scored by Ennio Morricone
Films about mental health
Films shot in Lazio
1960s Italian films